Stormi Bree Henley (born December 6, 1990), also known simply as Stormi Bree, is an American singer, actress, model and beauty pageant titleholder. At age 18, she was crowned Miss Teen USA 2009, after previously winning Miss Tennessee Teen USA 2009.

Personal life
Henley is the daughter of Kip and Sissi Henley and has a sister named Darbi Henley.  Her father was the winner of The Golf Channel's The Big Break II reality television competition.  
She is a 2009 graduate of Cumberland County High School and represented her school at regional golf competitions.

Henley has a daughter, Gravity Blue Smith (born July 26, 2017) with former partner Lucky Blue Smith.

Career

Miss Teen USA
Henley won the Miss Tennessee Teen USA 2009 title on October 5, 2008, after competing in the pageant for the first time.
 
In July 2009, Henley represented Tennessee in the Miss Teen USA 2009 pageant held in 
Atlantis Paradise Island, Nassau, Bahamas, which was the second Miss Teen USA pageant held outside the United States. This was the first internationally web-cast Miss Teen USA pageant, after the television contract ended with the 2007 event. In the final competition on July 31, 2009, Henley was crowned Miss Teen USA 2009 by outgoing titleholder Stevi Perry. She was the second teen from Tennessee to win Miss Teen USA and Tennessee's second national titleholder in three years, following the Miss USA win of Rachel Smith in 2007.  Prior to Henley's win, only Oregon and Texas had produced more than one Miss Teen USA titleholder.

During her reign Henley made appearances of the behalf of the Miss Universe Organization alongside her sister queens Kristen Dalton, Miss USA 2009, from North Carolina, and Stefanía Fernández, Miss Universe 2009, from Venezuela.

Music
Stormi auditioned for American Idol Season 10 and was given a Golden Ticket for Hollywood. She was eliminated in the first round of Hollywood Week.

In 2012 Henley joined music group U.G.L.Y., signed to Chris Brown (American entertainer)'s recording label CBE with fellow artists Barry "Mijo" Bradford and Braxton Olita.

She starred in American musician Børns's music video for his single "I Don't Want U Back". It was released on February 14, 2018.

Acting
Stormi appeared in "Boyle's Hunch" (2015), in the third season of FOX sitcom Brooklyn Nine-Nine. In 2014 she played a humanoid in 2307 Winter's Dream, a science fiction film starring Paul Sidhu which was directed by Joey Curtis and produced by Robert Beaumont.

References

External links
Miss Tennessee Teen USA official website
Miss Teen USA official profile

1990 births
Living people
People from Crossville, Tennessee
Beauty pageant contestants from Tennessee
American beauty pageant winners
Miss Teen USA winners
21st-century American women singers
21st-century American singers
American Idol participants